The San Juan Ridge is a geographic feature  extending approximately  east-northeast between the South and Middle Yuba Rivers in the foothills of the northern Sierra Nevada.  The elevation is approximately 790 m (2,600 ft) above sea level.

History
"The Ridge" was notable for hydraulic mining during the California gold rush, the largest operation of its kind being run by North Bloomfield Mining and Gravel Company. French Corral was the first mining camp on The Ridge. In the 1990s, research was conducted to renew gold mining efforts.

Tourism
The South Yuba River State Park and Malakoff Diggins State Historic Park are nearby, as is historic Nevada City, California.

External links

References

Landforms of Nevada County, California
Ridges of California
Landforms of the Sierra Nevada (United States)